The women's 500 metres races of the 2014–15 ISU Speed Skating World Cup 6, arranged in the Thialf arena in Heerenveen, Netherlands, were held on the weekend of 7–8 February 2015.

Race one was won by Heather Richardson of the United States, while Nao Kodaira of Japan came second, and Brittany Bowe of the United States came third. Yvonne Daldossi of Italy won Division B of race one, and was thus, under the rules, automatically promoted to Division A for race two.

Race two was won by Judith Hesse of Germany, while Lee Sang-hwa of South Korea came second, and Thijsje Oenema of the Netherlands came third. Li Huawei of China won Division B of race two.

Race 1
Race one took place on Saturday, 7 February, with Division B scheduled in the morning session, at 10:45, and Division A scheduled in the afternoon session, at 15:30.

Division A

Division B

Race 2
Race two took place on Sunday, 8 February, with Division B scheduled in the morning session, at 10:21, and Division A scheduled in the afternoon session, at 15:00.

Division A

Division B

References

Women 0500
6